Jean-Claude Amoureux (born 4 March 1956) is a French sprinter. He competed in the men's 100 metres at the 1976 Summer Olympics.

References

External links

1956 births
Living people
Athletes (track and field) at the 1976 Summer Olympics
French male sprinters
Olympic athletes of France